The Tour of Bihor-Bellotto is a multi-day cycling race in Bihor, Romania established 2016.  It is part of UCI Europe Tour in category 2.1.

Winners

References

External links
 

 
Cycle races in Romania
Sport in Bihor County
UCI Europe Tour races
Recurring sporting events established in 2016
2016 establishments in Romania
Annual sporting events in Romania
May sporting events
June sporting events